Ryan International Airlines, Inc. was an American FAR 121 airline with domestic, flag, and supplemental authority.

Synopsis and history
Based at Chicago Rockford International Airport in Rockford, Illinois, the US Postal Service was once the airline's main customer, utilizing Boeing 727 aircraft operated by Ryan International on scheduled mail delivery flights. Ryan also flew non-scheduled charter passenger services for excursion and tour packagers, along with the United States Department of Defense, the United States Department of Justice, and others.

In 1998, the airline began operating flights from California to Hawaii and Mexico, using a pair of McDonnell Douglas DC-10 aircraft and several Airbus A320s on behalf of SunTrips, a vacation package operator in California. The aircraft were operated with Skyservice USA titles and wore the livery of Airtours International Airways, SunTrips' parent company. In 2000, the Skyservice USA titles were replaced with SunTrips titles on the aircraft. Later, Ryan would operate SunTrips flights using Boeing 757 aircraft in Ryan's own livery.

The airline was wholly owned by Ronald Ryan until 2005, when it was purchased by commercial real-estate firm Rubloff Development Group. Ryan operated scheduled passenger flights with Airbus A320 jets for AirTran Airways between Atlanta and the US west coast in 2003 and 2004, after which AirTran began operating the flights themselves with newly delivered Boeing 737-700 aircraft.

Since moving to Rubloff's headquarters in Rockford in 2006, Ryan held a notable number of contracts working mainly for the United States Department of Defense and the United States Department of Homeland Security (DHS). Until summer 2008, it maintained large operations in Milwaukee St Louis and Boston for Funjet and Apple Vacations.  These contracts were terminated following the failure of European carrier Futura International Airways, from which Ryan leased several aircraft to support this operation.

In November 2011, Ryan took delivery their first Airbus A330-300, leased from Virgin Atlantic.

In February 2012, Ryan furloughed pilots, flight attendants, and support staff. On March 6, 2012, Ryan filed for Chapter 11 bankruptcy, citing "unexpected and dramatic reductions in military flying." On April 1, 2012, Ryan lost its bid to continue flying for the DHS. The loss of the DHS contract resulted in the immediate grounding of four McDonnell Douglas MD-80 aircraft to cut costs. On August 1, 2012, Ryan returned its A330-300 to Virgin Atlantic, ending its lease and accepting an older model Airbus A330-200 formerly operated by Atlasjet. Six days later, Jeff Potter, former CEO of Frontier Airlines was hired as the "Chief Restructuring Officer" for Ryan. He is also the President and CEO of aviation consulting firm Boyd Group International. Ryan's President/COO Mike McCabe had left Ryan in May due to cancer surgery. On August 15, 2012, Ryan announced it would be furloughing approximately 30 pilots and 60 flight attendants throughout the coming weeks. Two days later, the majority of flight attendants voted "Yes" to the AFA Contract agreement. At the end of that month, 25 or more management and administrative positions were eliminated. Those positions received same-day notice as the company attempted to further cut costs. Ryan again announced it would be furloughing more pilots and approximately 18 more flight attendants.

On January 11, 2013, Ryan International Airlines' CEO announced that the airline had gone into liquidation. Its staff were dismissed and it ceased operations. On January 31, 2013, charter air-tour operator AstraJet's holding company, AJET Holdings LLC, signed a purchase agreement to buy Ryan International out of bankruptcy with plans to restart the airline under the AstraJet name, operating commercial and charter flights out of Europe to Florida, the Far East, Hawaii, Nevada, and South America. The purchase was completed on March 4, 2013, with AJET taking control of Ryan's Part-121 scheduled-air-carrier license and collective-bargaining agreement with flight attendants and pilots.

Kickback fraud scheme 
On August 13, 2013, a grand jury returned an indictment against Sean E. Wagner, the former owner and operator of Aviation Fuel International (AFI), and against AFI, charging them for their roles in a conspiracy to defraud Ryan International Airlines. According to the indictment, Wagner and AFI made kickback payments to Wayne Kepple, a former vice president of ground operations for Ryan, in exchange for awarding business to AFI.

According to court documents, from at least as early as December 2005 through at least August 2009, Wagner and others at AFI made kickback payments to Kepple totaling more than $200,000 in the form of checks, wire transfers, cash and gift cards.

Wagner  pleaded guilty on March 12, 2014, to participating in a kickback scheme to defraud Ryan Airlines. The charges against AFI were dismissed on February 21, 2014.

Fleet 

Ryan International operated a diverse fleet of jetliners during its existence including the following aircraft:

 Airbus A320
 Airbus A330-200
 Airbus A330-300
 Boeing 727-100
 Boeing 727-200
 Boeing 737-200
 Boeing 737-300
 Boeing 737-400
 Boeing 737-500
 Boeing 737-800
 Boeing 757-200
 Boeing 767-300
 McDonnell Douglas DC-9-10
 McDonnell Douglas DC-10-10
 McDonnell Douglas MD-82
 McDonnell Douglas MD-83
 McDonnell Douglas MD-87

Incidents and accidents 
Ryan International only had two accidents in its history, one of which was fatal.

 On February 17, 1991, Ryan International Airlines Flight 590, a McDonnell Douglas DC-9-15 (registration N565PC) crashed after takeoff from Cleveland Hopkins International Airport. The aircraft was on a cargo flight carrying mail. Both pilots, the aircraft's only occupants, were killed.
 On October 1, 1997, A Boeing 727-51C (registration N414EX) operating as Flight 607 collided with a shuttle bus at Denver International Airport. There were no fatalities. All three crew members survived, though the captain and first officer were injured. The driver of the shuttle bus was also injured. The aircraft was substantially damaged and written off.

See also 
 List of defunct airlines of the United States

References

External links 

Ryan International Airlines
Ryan International Airlines aircraft

Defunct airlines of the United States
Airlines established in 1972
Airlines disestablished in 2013
Companies that filed for Chapter 11 bankruptcy in 2012
Companies based in Rockford, Illinois
Defunct charter airlines